Local elections was held in Antipolo on May 10, 2004, within the Philippine general election. The voters elected candidates for the elective local posts in the city: the mayor, vice mayor, the two district congressmen, two provincial board members of Rizal, one for each district, and the sixteen councilors, eight in each of the city's districts.

Background 
Incumbent Mayor Angelito "Lito" Gatlabayan ran for his third and final term. He was challenged by Susana Garcia-Say.

Incumbent Vice Mayor Danilo "Nilo" Leyble ran for re-election.

On December 22, 2003, the Municipality of Antipolo was converted into a city, and its lone district was dissolved into two.

Ronaldo "Ronnie" Puno ran for his first term as representative of the newly created First District. He was challenged by Josefina "Pining" Gatlabayan, wife of incumbent Mayor Angelito Gatlabayan.

Incumbent Lone District Representative Victor "Vic" Sumulong ran for his first time as representative of the newly created Second District, and third term as representative of Antipolo's lone district (dissolved). He was challenged by former Vice Mayor and OIC-Mayor Felix Mariñas.

Results

For Mayor 
Incumbent Mayor Angelito "Lito" Gatlabayan defeated Susana Garcia-Say.

For Vice Mayor 
Incumbent Vice Mayor Danilo "Nilo" Leyble was re-elected.

For Representative

First District 
Ronaldo "Ronnie" Puno defeated Josefina "Pining" Gatlabayan, wife of incumbent Mayor Angelito Gatlabayan.

Second District 
Incumbent Lone District Representative Victor "Vic" Sumulong defeated former Vice Mayor and OIC-Mayor Felix Mariñas.

For City Councilors

First District

Second District

Note 
The councilors' names are found in a digital copy of a city ordinance photocopy.

Here's the link of the digital copy: https://www.yumpu.com/it/document/read/9588479/illipliwea-moeuto-2-iiltmielliliyiiiliii-antipolo-city

References

Politics of Antipolo
2004 Philippine local elections
Elections in Antipolo
2004 elections in Calabarzon